Siiri Vallner (born April 9, 1972) is an industrious Estonian architect. She works mostly in community projects, as well as in many competitions. She is a member of the Union of Estonian Architects.

Biography 
Born in Tallinn, Estonia, she spent a lot of her childhood going to work with her parents, surrounded by technology. Her parents worked in IT during the time of the Soviet Union, picking up personal projects after their normal work hours.

As a teenager recently graduating high school, she was opposed to many of her options of a career. Though she graduated from a high school specializing in sciences, she was not interested in pursuing math as a career. This left her with architecture. She got into, and studied at the  Estonian Academy of Arts in the architecture department, graduating in 1997. From 1998 to 1999 she studied in the Virginia Polytechnic Institute and State University.

Following her Graduating from Virginia Polytechnic Institute and State University, she worked at architecture firms Berzak & Gold P.C. in New York and Lewis & Associates Ltd. in Alexandria, Virginia. After returning to Estonia in 2002, she founded Kavakava with, Katrin Koov and Kaire Nōmm, and Head Arhitektid Oü, with Indrek Peil.

Projects

Competitions and Awards

See also
 List of Estonian architects
 List of women architects

References

1972 births
Living people
Architects from Tallinn
Women architects
Estonian women architects